Keshet is an Israeli settlement in the Golan Heights, organized as a moshav shitufi. It was established in 1974 after the Yom Kippur War by young activists near the Syrian city of Quneitra, which had been occupied and subsequently razed to the ground in the Six-Day War. Its name is a translation of the name Quneitra ("arch").

The international community considers Israeli settlements in the Golan Heights illegal under international law, but the Israeli government disputes this.

Geography
It is located just south of Highway 87 between the Keshet Junction and the Bashan Junction.

History

Keshet was established in the period between the cease-fire and armistice agreement following the Yom Kippur War by national-religious and secular demonstrators who opposed an Israeli withdrawal to the pre-war line. They initially settled in a bunker in the fringes of Quneitra, but were forced to relocate to an abandoned Syrian farm when Quneitra was returned to Syria as part of the armistice agreement. Four months later, the Israeli government agreed to establish the settlement, and the settlers moved to another temporary location in an abandoned Syrian military camp further west. The settlement at its present location was established in 1978.

Economy
The community's economy is based on agriculture and tourism, and it has a field school and a religious mechina (military preparatory institution).

See also
 Israeli-occupied territories

References

External links
 About Keshet 

Israeli settlements in the Golan Heights
Moshavim
Golan Regional Council
Populated places in Northern District (Israel)
Populated places established in 1974
1974 establishments in the Israeli Military Governorate